Michael Hurtz (born 24 April 1979) is a German darts player currently playing in Professional Darts Corporation events.

Nicknamed "Hurtzi", Hurtz first qualified for a PDC European Tour in 2013, when he qualified for the 2013 German Darts Championship, losing to Peter Wright in the second round. He has qualified for many European Tour events via the Host Nation Qualifiers, but, has never got past the second round.

References

External links

Living people
German darts players
Professional Darts Corporation associate players
1979 births
People from Stendal
Sportspeople from Saxony-Anhalt
20th-century German people
21st-century German people